Scotland Food & Drink is the industry leadership trade association established in 2007. It aims to collaboratively grow the value of the industry to £30 billion by 2030 and to reinforce the reputation of Scotland as a Land of Food and Drink.

In addition to its private sources of income it receives financial support from the Scottish Government.

Every year Scotland Food & Drink helps organise the Scottish Food and Drink Fortnight.

History
Scotland Food & Drink was created in June 2007, and aims to brings together all key sectors of Scotland's food and drink industry, plus trade organisations and public sector agencies (Scottish Enterprise and Highlands and Islands Enterprise).

Its launch was the first official engagement of Richard Lochhead MSP in his role as Cabinet Secretary for Rural Affairs and the Environment for the Scottish Government. Since then, the organisation has developed and launched a new strategy for the entire industry called Ambition 2030 which looks to grow the industry to a value of £30bn by 2030.

Its inaugural chief executive, Paul McLaughlin, left in August 2011 to join Scotty Brand Ltd and was replaced in September 2011 by James Withers.

Funding
Scotland Food & Drink is a membership organisation, funded by subscriptions. It also receives funding support from Scottish Government.

Membership and affiliated groups
Members are drawn from across the Scottish food and drink industry, and include farmers, retailers, supporting organisations and trade associations. Members receive various benefits and services, and can contribute to industry-wide initiatives.

An executive group ensures support across the sectors. Its members include:
Agriculture and Horticulture Development Board
Dairy UK
Highlands and Islands Enterprise
Improve Ltd
Lantra
National Farmers Union Scotland
Quality Meat Scotland
Rowett Research Institute
Scotch Whisky Association
Scottish Agricultural College
Scottish Agricultural Organisations Society (SAOS)
Scottish Association of Master Bakers
Scottish Enterprise
Scottish Food & Drink Federation
Scottish Salmon Producers Organisation
Seafood Scotland

References

 Scotland Food and Drink
Food industry trade groups based in the United Kingdom
2007 establishments in Scotland
Organisations supported by the Scottish Government
Industry trade groups based in Scotland
Private companies limited by guarantee of Scotland
Organizations established in 2007